The Tirtha lineage of Siddhayoga is a mystical sect of Shaivite Hinduism that relies on direct experience of life-force or kundalini shakti and understanding of the Shastras. It holds the guru-disciple relationship to be of primary importance. Shakti is said to be automatically infused into a disciple by a guru in a process called Shaktipat.

There are many Siddhayoga lineages and many other groups not using the name that speak in terms of the infusion of kundalini shakti. Some lineages originated from the same source, others are completely unrelated. Siddhayoga is similar to sahajayoga, mahayoga or siddhamahayoga. Similar teachings may be traced back at least to the Tantric masters such as the scholar Abhinavagupta. Shakti is held to be the energy of a universal soul, of which direct experience is available regardless of religion; thus siddhayoga is sometimes considered a universal rather than a strictly Hindu practice.

Scriptural sources

Siddhayoga aims to uncover an eternal source of abundance for all to share – peace, creativity, spiritual energy and eternal soul. The guru makes this happen for the disciple.<ref>Swami Sadashiva Tirtha. Founder, Swami Narayan Tirtha Math; Author, Bhagavad Gita for Modern Time& Ayurveda Encyclopedia. Personal conversation, 2007</ref> Its most important text is the Yoga Vani.

The siddhayoga guru prepares the kundalini shakti which automatically gets infused in the disciple at the muladhara chakra, awakening and raising spiritual energy up the Sushumna 
Various ancient texts discuss this effect of nearness to the guru. The Kularnava Tantra states that "An intelligent person should regard this teacher as their preceptor by whose contact inexpressible bliss is produced in the disciple," and the Yoga Vasistha says that "A real preceptor is one who can produce blissful sensation in the body of the disciple by their sight, touch, or instructions."

Siddhayoga is said to be an internal transformation, allowing a person to grow more into their nature regardless of their outer path, rites and rituals; what they do and how they do it in the outer world is unique to their own individual path (dharma). One who yearns to connect with their soul or God, who strives for mental peace and harmony with all people, animals, and nature, who tries to live in balance with nature's rhythms and who aims to live purposefully will find these higher desires fulfilled in experiencing of soul and developing of inner divine love.

Siddhayoga lineage

Swami Shankar Purushottam Tirtha (1888-1958) descended from two monastic lines. He was first initiated into Siddhayoga by Swami Narayana Dev Tirtha [born circa 1879], whose own spiritual lineage was through Swami Gangadhara Tirtha. Swami Shankar Purushottam Tirtha then took sannyas under Swami Bharati Krishna Tirtha in Puri. During Swami Bharati Krishna Tirtha's visit to America, Swami Shankar Purushottam Tirtha was asked to maintain the holy seat of Shankaracharya of Puri Govardhan Mutt.

Swami Shankar Purushottam Tirtha was not keen to be bound by the obligations pertaining to the office of Shankaracharya, including administrative responsibilities. His greater objective was to spread the thought of God among all people. As a result, brushing aside the honour of and fascination for the position of Shankaracharya, he set out, proceeding to the north in the direction of the Himalayas, always an attraction to yogis, seers, and sages as the ideal place for sadhana. The King of Tehri Garhwal, appreciative of the blessings he received from him, expressed his desire to donate a vast stretch of land by the Ganga, but he accepted only a modest plot after repeated entreaties of the king.

The ashram named Shankar Math Uttarkashi was established in 1933. Later, another Math  in Varanasi's Chhoti Gaibi, named "Siddhayogashram" was founded in 1934. Swami Shankar Purushottam Tirtha wrote several books such as Yogavani, Japa Sadhana, and Guruvani which were originally written in Bengali, later translated into Hindi. He also wrote a short treatise in English, entitled Who Am I?

Swami Shankar Purushottam Tirtha  was the guru of Swami Narayana Tirtha (d. 2001). Swami Vishnu Tirtha was another disciple of Swami Shankar Purushottam Tirtha. He was initiated in 1939. Swami Shivom Tirtha, a disciple of Swami Vishnu Tirtha, has a website dedicated to him that explains the Tirtha Siddhayoga lineage tree in more detail.

The Tirtha lineage of Swami Bharati Krishna Tirtha (1884-1960) traces itself back to Sri Adi Shankara. In legend the lineage (parampara) began when Lord Narayana passed the eternal Vedic wisdom to Brahma, Brahma to Vasishtha, onto Shakti, to Parashara, to Veda Vyasa, and to Shuka.  Thus far the lineage was from father to son. From Shuka it was passed on from guru to shishya, to Patanjali, then to Gaudapada, Govinda, Chandra Sharma and so to Adi Shankara.

This began the tradition of wandering monks. Vyasa told Govinda of the advent of the incarnation of Shiva as Adi Shankara, to meet and give him sanyas diksha, Shankara's purpose in incarnating was to comment on the Brahma Sutras. Shankaracharya set up four religious seats in the north, south, east and west of India to act as a lighthouse to guide religious seekers towards the truth for the millennia to come and also set up the ten monastic orders. 1) Tirtha, 2) Ashrama, 3) Vana, 4) Aranya, 5) Giri, 6) Parvata, 7) Sagara, 8) Saraswati, 9) Bharati, 10) Puri.

Faith in the guru

As with much Hindu or Vedic mysticism, Siddhayoga's goal of life is to realize one is eternal soul and not this body. Suffering is said to be caused by identifying with body, emotions, or thoughts, rather than with true nature.

The rules of a discipline may become unnatural because they are artificially imposed: even when doing one's best to remain balanced and free one often finds oneself once again bound. Siddhayoga says that through the grace of a Siddhayoga guru all the work is done for you. You do not force anything; you are not charged anything or asked for anything by the guru – so there is no conflict of interest. One gains peace through direct experience of peace, not from intellectual knowledge of peace. Once peace is felt, the intellect confirms it.

Siddhayoga is said to be for those people who take responsibility for their lives, who are self-reliant, whose focus in life is to help others, the creatures, and Mother Nature, who aim for inner and outer balance in life, eat sensibly and healthfully, live a life of moderation and seek to be purposeful in life.

Current gurus and ashramas

India

On 2 March 2001, Swami Narayana Tirtha died at Siddhayogashram in Varanasi.

Swami Atmananda Tirtha, who is a disciple and successor of Swami Narayana Tirtha, is the current Mathadhyaksha of all the ashramas in India - including the Siddhayoga Ashram in Varanasi and the Shankar Math in Uttar-Kashi. He speaks and writes fluently in Bengali, Hindi, and English.

Shankar Math is located in Uttarkashi, in the Himalayas (State: Uttaranchal). It was donated to Swami Shankar Purushottam Tirtha by the raja (king) of the region, who received blessings from Swami Shankar Purushottam Tirtha. Siddhayogashram is located in Chhoti Gaibi, Varanasi, and was built by Swami Shankar Purushottam Tirtha's disciples who wished him to live closer to them, since, in those days, a visit to Shankar Math in Uttarkashi required one to trek on mountainous terrain for 2 weeks from Rishikesh.

America
Swami Narayana Tirtha's successor in America is Swami Sadashiva Tirtha. He speaks English, Hindi and Bengali and  has  studied Ayurveda, Jyotish, and Vastu shastras. He is the author of Bhagavad Gita for Modern Times, and the Ayurveda Encyclopedia''. Swami Narayan Tirtha Math was founded by Swami Sadashiva Tirtha in New York, USA.

Publications 
Several books have been published in Bengali, Hindi, and English by Purushottam Publishers ordered by Swami Atmananda Tirtha.

References

External links
Swami Narayan Tirtha Math
Swami Nardanand
Swami Narayan Tirtha Ved Vidya Sanskriti Charcha Kendra, Varanasi

Siddhayoga